Jorge Alfredo Vásquez (born 23 April 1945) is a retired football player from El Salvador who represented his country at the 1968 Summer Olympics and at the 1970 FIFA World Cup in Mexico.

Club career
Vásquez played for Salvadoran clubs UES and Platense.

International career
Nicknamed el Indio, Vásquez has represented his country in 10 FIFA World Cup qualification matches and played at the 1970 FIFA World Cup.

References

1945 births
Living people
Association football midfielders
Salvadoran footballers
El Salvador international footballers
Olympic footballers of El Salvador
Footballers at the 1968 Summer Olympics
1970 FIFA World Cup players